Yevgeniy Gidich (born 19 May 1996) is a Kazakhstani professional racing cyclist, who currently rides for UCI WorldTeam . He rode in the men's team time trial at the 2015 UCI Road World Championships.

Major results

2016
 Tour of Qinghai Lake
1st Stages 3 & 5
 1st Stage 6 Tour of Iran (Azerbaijan)
 1st Stage 1 Tour of Bulgaria
 2nd Overall Tour de Filipinas
 3rd Road race, National Road Championships
2017
 1st  Overall Tour of Thailand
1st Stage 1
 1st Stage 13 Tour of Qinghai Lake
 2nd  Road race, Asian Under–23 Road Championships
 3rd Overall Tour de Korea
 7th Overall Tour of Almaty
2018
 3rd Overall Tour of Croatia
1st  Young rider classification
 6th Overall Tour de Langkawi
2019
 1st  Road race, Asian Road Championships
 1st Stage 3 CRO Race
 7th Coppa Bernocchi
2022
 1st  Team time trial, Asian Road Championships
 1st  Road race, National Road Championships
 3rd Grand Prix Gazipaşa

References

External links
 

1996 births
Sportspeople from Kokshetau
Living people
Kazakhstani male cyclists
Cyclists at the 2018 Asian Games
Asian Games competitors for Kazakhstan
20th-century Kazakhstani people
21st-century Kazakhstani people